The 2008 European Masters Games was the first edition of the multi-sport event for masters sport, which took place between 29 August – 7 September 2008 in Malmö, Sweden. 3022 participants from 46 countries competed in 18 sports.

Sports

American football
Archery
Athletics
Badminton
Beach volleyball
Cue sports (Pool)
Fencing
Football
Golf

Handball
Indoor Bandy
Karate
Orienteering
Rugby
Squash
Table tennis
Volleyball
Wrestling

The sports that were contracted, but that did not hold their competitions, were:
  Basketball
  Carom billiards
  Boules/Petanque
  Bowling
  Cycling
  Ju-Jitsu
  Judo
  Lifesaving
  Rowing
  Sailing
  Shooting

Exhibition sports

During the week of the EMG a number of sporting events were held that were associated with the EMG, but that had their own organisations and application systems. These were an invitation competition for   fencing, an   international football match for   “old    boys” between the  Danish  European  champions  from  1992  and  the  Swedish  team that finished third in the 1994 World Cup at Malmö IP, the Christian-loppet race (an open cycling race between Helsingborg and Malmö) and an open half marathon.

References

Results
 https://www.imga.ch/assets/Uploads/Reports/EMG2008-Final-Report.pdf
 https://www.imga.ch/assets/Uploads/Results/Athletics.pdf
 http://websites.sportstg.com/select_node.cgi?cID=2209&p=1
 http://websites.sportstg.com/assoc_page.cgi?assoc=4674&pID=1
 http://websites.sportstg.com/assoc_page.cgi?assoc=4665&pID=1
 http://websites.sportstg.com/assoc_page.cgi?assoc=4676&pID=1
 http://websites.sportstg.com/assoc_page.cgi?assoc=4679&pID=1
 http://websites.sportstg.com/assoc_page.cgi?assoc=4670&pID=1
 http://websites.sportstg.com/assoc_page.cgi?assoc=4656&pID=1
 http://websites.sportstg.com/assoc_page.cgi?assoc=4654&pID=1
 http://websites.sportstg.com/assoc_page.cgi?assoc=4673&pID=1
 http://websites.sportstg.com/assoc_page.cgi?assoc=4671&pID=1
 http://websites.sportstg.com/assoc_page.cgi?assoc=4682&pID=1
 http://websites.sportstg.com/assoc_page.cgi?assoc=4667&pID=1
 http://websites.sportstg.com/assoc_page.cgi?assoc=4664&pID=1
 http://websites.sportstg.com/assoc_page.cgi?assoc=4660&pID=1
 http://websites.sportstg.com/assoc_page.cgi?assoc=4655&pID=1
 http://websites.sportstg.com/assoc_page.cgi?assoc=4653&pID=1

External links
 2015 European Masters Games
 EMG 2008 Blog

Masters Games
European Masters Games
Multi-sport events in Sweden
International sports competitions hosted by Sweden